Choiseul Bay Airport  is an airport at Choiseul Bay on Taro Island, part of the Choiseul Province in the Solomon Islands.

The airport has scheduled flights provided by Solomon Airlines, using DHC-6 Twin Otter aircraft.

Airlines and destinations

See also
 List of airports in the Solomon Islands

References

Airports in the Solomon Islands